We Wanted a Revolution: Black Radical Women, 1965–85 was an exhibition held at the Brooklyn Museum of Art from April 21, 2017 through September 17, 2017. The exhibition surveyed the last twenty years of black female art and it presented more than forty artists and activists who decided to dedicate their work to fight against racism, sexism, homophobia, and class injustice. It was not organized chronologically or by authorship, but thematically.

The structure of the exhibition 
We Wanted a Revolution: Black Radical Women, 1965–85 was organized by Catherine Morris, Sackler Family Senior Curator for the Elizabeth A. Sackler Center for Feminist Art, and Rujeko Hockley, former Assistant Curator of Contemporary Art, with Allie Rickard, Curatorial Assistant, Elizabeth A. Sackler Center for Feminist Art, Brooklyn Museum. The exhibition was part of A Year of Yes: Reimagining Feminism at the Brooklyn Museum, a yearlong series of exhibitions celebrating the 10th anniversary of the Elizabeth A. Sackler Center for Feminist Art. Leadership support was provided by Elizabeth A. Sackler, the Ford Foundation, the Stavros Niarchos Foundation, Anne Klein, the Calvin Klein Family Foundation, the Institute of Museum and Library Services, Mary Jo and Ted Shen, and an anonymous donor. Financial support was also provided by Annette Blum, the Taylor Foundation, the Antonia and Vladimir Kulaev Cultural Heritage Fund, Beth Dozoretz, The Cowles Charitable Trust, and Almine Rech Gallery.

Within the varieties of media were conceptual art, performance, film, and video, printmaking, photography, and painting. Despite the significant differentiation between the mediums, the goal of vocalizing Black female artists and bringing up the notion of oppression of black female or non-binary artists in the art world and in culture united the artworks of the exhibition. We Wanted a Revolution consisted of nine sections, wherein each section referred to a specific theme or media.

Artists and movements

Spiral and The Black Arts Movement 
Spiral is a group of Black artists that was active between 1963 and 1965. It was formed by Romare Bearden, Norman Lewis, Hale Woodruff and Charles Alston on July 5, 1963.

Emma Amos, born 1938 
Emma Amos was born in Atlanta, Georgia, in 1938. She is an African American postmodernist painter and printmaker. Some of her works were exhibited including:

 Flower Sniffer, 1966
 Sandy and Her Husband, 1973

Elizabeth Catlett, 1915–2012 
Elizabeth Catlett was a Mexican-American Modernist sculptor whose subject matter was often concentrated on black female experience. Elizabeth was born in Washington, D.C.

 Homage to My Young Black Sisters, 1968

Jeff Donaldson, 1932–2004 
Jeff Donaldson was an African-American visual artist of the Black Arts Movement.

 Wives of Shango, 1969
 "Africobra: African Commune of Bad Relevant Artists; 10 in Search of a Nation" Black World 19, no. 12 (October 1970)

Rudy Irwin (Baba Kachenga), d. 1969 

 WEUSI Art Creators, undated

Jae Jarrell, born 1935 

 Ebony Family, 1968
 Urban Wall Suit, 1969

Wadsworth A. Jarrell, born 1929 

 Revolutionary, 1971

Lois Mailou Jones, 1905-1998 

 Ode to Kinshasa, 1972
 Ubi Girl from Tai Region, 1972

Lary Neal, 1937-1981 

 "Any Day Now: Black Art and Black Liberation", Ebony (August 1969)

Faith Ringgold, born 1930 

 Early Works #25: Self-Portrait, 1965

Jeanne Siegel, 1929-2013 

 "Why Spiral?" Artnews 65, no.5 (September 1966)
 First Group Showing: Works in Black and White, 1963
 Jet, 1971
 Weusi Group Portrait, 1970s

Prints and Posters

Emma Amos, born 1938 

 Summer 1968, 1968

Kay Brown, 1932-2012 

 Sister with Braids, the late 1960s - early 1970s
 Willowbrook, 1972

Elizabeth Catlett, 1915–2012 

 Malcolm X Speaks for Us, 1969
 Harriet, 1975
 There Is a Woman in Every Color, 1975
 Madonna, 1982

Barbara Jones-Hogu, born 1938 

 I'm Better Than These Motherfuckers, 1970
 Nation Time, 1970
 Relate to Your Heritage, 1971
 Unite, 1971
 Black Men We Need You, 1971

Carolyn Lawrence, born 1940 

 Uphold Your Men, 1971

Samella Lewis, born 1924 

 Family, 1967
 Field, 1968

"Where We At" Black Women Artists

Kay Brown, 1932-2012 

 "Where We At' Black Women Artists". Feminist Art Journal 1, no. 1 (April 1972)
 Kick of Life, 1974
 She Sees No Evil; She Hears No Evil; She Speaks No Evil, 1982
 Sister Alone in a Rented Room, undated

Carole Byard, 1941-2017 

 Yasmina and the Moon, 1975

Pat Davis 

 "Where We At' Black Women Artists" digital C-print, 1980

Pat Minardi, born 1942 

 "Open Hearing at Brooklyn Museum", Feminist Art Journal (April 1972)

Dinga McCannon, born 1947 

Revolutionary Sister, 1971
Morning After, 1973
Empress Akweke, 1975

"Where We At" Black Women Artists Inc., founded 1971 

 Cookin' and Smokin''', 1972
 "Where We At": A Tribe of Black Women Artists, 1973
 "Where We At" Black Women Artists Letterhead, 1980

 Black Feminism 

Some of the participants in the section were:

 James Baldwin, 1924-1987
 Audre Lorde, 1934-1992
 Lorraine Bethel
 Barbara Smith, born 1946
 Vivian E. Browne, 1929-1993
 Elizabeth Catlett, 1915–2012
 Claudia Chapline, born 1930
 Barbara Chase-Rebound, born 1939
 Maren Hassinger, born 194
 Leonard Levitt, born 1941
 Samella Lewis, born 1924
 Toni Morrison, born 1931
 Faith Ringgold, born 1930
 Bettye Saar, born 1926
 Margaret Sloan, 1947-2004
 Gloria Steinem, born 1934
 Alice Walker, born in 1944
 Michele Wallace, born 1952

 Art World Activism 

Some of the participants in the section were:

 The Committee to Defend the Judson Three, founded in 1971
 Flo Kennedy, 1916-2000
 Gerald Lefcourt, born 1941
 Robert Projansky
 Pat Mainardi, born 1942
 Black Emergency Cultural Coalition, founded in 1969
 Linda Goode Bryant, 1949
 Carol Duncan, born 1936
 Grace Glueck, born 1926
 Janet Henry, born 1947
 Luce R. Lippard, born 1937
 Donald Newman, born 1955
 Howardena Pindell, born 1943
 James Reinish
 Ingrid Sischy, (born in South Africa, 1952-2015)
 Helene Winer, born 1946
 Faith Ringgold, born 1930
 Jan Van Raay, born 1942
 Michele Wallace, born 1952
 Women Artists in Revolution, founded in 1969
 Ad Hoc Women Artists' Committee, founded 1970
Women Students and Artists for Black Art Liberation, founded in 1970

 Dialectics of Isolation 

 Heresies 

 Just above Midtown Gallery 

 The 1980s 

 Public programs 
Symposium was held at the Brooklyn Museum of Art on April 21, 2017. As a part of the exhibition events, the art historian Kellie Jones, author and feminist theory scholar Aruna D'Souza, and Black cultural studies academic Uri McMillan gave speeches and participated in a panel discussion.

 Reception and Criticism 
The exhibition was covered by several magazines. The New York Times' main critique was that the selection of artists was rather one-sided and narrow, which is why many prominent black artists remained unrepresented. The only change I would make, apart from adding more artists, would be to tweak its title: I’d edit it down to its opening phrase and put that in the present tense.. — Holland Cotter (The New York Times)The New Yorker'' presented a short response for the exhibition:The several dozen artists whose work is featured in this superlative survey did not conform to one style, but they did share urgent concerns, often addressing issues of bias and exclusion in their art—and in their art-world organizing. The Just Above Midtown Gallery (JAM), a crucial New York institution of the black avant-garde, was instrumental to the careers of a number of them, including Lorraine O’Grady, whose sardonic pageant gown made of countless white gloves—the artist wore it in guerrilla performances at gallery openings—is a wonder. There is much powerful photography on view, from Ming Smith’s spontaneous portraits of Harlemites in the seventies to Lorna Simpson and Carrie Mae Weems’s poignant pairings of image and text, from the eighties. But the ephemera—the fascinating documentation and spirited newsletters—provide the exhibition’s glue, presenting the women not as anomalous achievers but as part of a formidable movement. — The New Yorker

Publications 
Two books were published as a part of the scholarship program for the exhibition.

Black Radical Women, 1965–85: A Sourcebook 
The book was first published in 2017 as an exhibition catalog. It contains thirty-eight reproductions of articles, poems, interviews, and other texts by or about the artists of the exhibition. The book provides the reader with the perspectives of black female art and Black culture in general that were most prioritized by the exhibition. The publication was intended for scholars or students of art history; however, it is accessible to a general reader.

We Wanted a Revolution: Black Radical Women, 1965–85: New Perspectives

Sponsorship and funding 
The exhibition was funded by the Ford Foundation, the Elizabeth A. Sackler Foundation, the Brooklyn Museum’s Contemporary Art Acquisitions Committee, the Andy Warhol Foundation for the Visual Arts, The Shelley & Donald Rubin Foundation, and the Barbara Lee Family Foundation.

References 

Feminist artists
20th-century American women artists
American women painters
American women printmakers
Women textile artists
Postmodern artists
African-American arts organizations
20th-century African-American women
20th-century African-American artists